Buk-gu,, or "Northern District", is the name of a gu in several South Korean cities:

 Buk-gu, Busan
 Buk-gu, Daegu
 Buk-gu, Gwangju
 Buk-gu, Pohang
 Buk-gu, Ulsan

See also
Northern District (disambiguation)